Alfius may refer to various members of the Roman gens Alfia. It may also refer to:

 Alfius (beetle), a genus of leaf beetles in the subfamily Chrysomelinae
 Nicolaas Alfius, a member of the Indonesia national rugby union team